Ronald Haigler (born 1953) is an American former basketball player and current high school basketball coach. He is best known for his collegiate career at the University of Pennsylvania between 1972–73 and 1974–75. A 6'8" power forward, Haigler helped guide the Quakers to several consecutive Ivy League titles as well as setting numerous offensive statistical records at Penn. He was named the first ever Ivy League Men's Basketball Player of the Year as a senior and was twice named the Philadelphia Big 5 Player of the Year.

After college, he was chosen as the 68th overall pick in the 1975 NBA Draft by the Chicago Bulls. He was also chosen in the 1975 ABA Draft by the Memphis Sounds as the 23rd overall pick, but Haigler ultimately did not play in either league. He did play for seven seasons in the Turkish Basketball League for Eczacıbaşı (1978 to 1984) and Efes Pilsen (1984–85).  As of 2016, he coaches high school girls basketball in Strawberry Mansion, Philadelphia, Pennsylvania.

References

External links
Turkish League profile

1953 births
Living people
American expatriate basketball people in Turkey
American men's basketball players
Anadolu Efes S.K. players
Basketball coaches from New York (state)
Basketball players from New York City
Chicago Bulls draft picks
High school basketball coaches in the United States
James Madison High School (Brooklyn) alumni
Memphis Sounds draft picks
Penn Quakers men's basketball players
Power forwards (basketball)
Sportspeople from Brooklyn